SBTK may refer to:

 Tarauacá Airport, Brazil (by ICAO code)
 Skepplanda bordtennisklubb, a sports club in Skepplanda, Sweden